Shatsky District is an administrative and municipal district (raion), one of the twenty-five in Ryazan Oblast, Russia. It is located in the southeast of the oblast. Its administrative center is the town of Shatsk. Population: 24,414 (2010 Census);  The population of Shatsk accounts for 26.9% of the district's total population.

Notable residents 

Gennadi Bogachyov (born 1945 in Shatsk), stage and film actor
Ivan Zakharkin (1889–1944), Soviet Army commander during World War II

References

Notes

Sources

Districts of Ryazan Oblast